The Investment Coordinating Board (BKPM) is Non-Ministerial Government Body in Indonesia for formulation of government policies in the field of investment, both domestically and abroad.

History
ICB was established in 1973, replacing the function carried out by the Investment Technical Committee which was formed previously in 1968. In 1982, ICB absorbed Ministry of Development for Domestic Product. In 1988, ICB transformed into State Ministry of Investment. In 1998, ICB/State Ministry of Investment was merged into Ministry of State Owned Enterprises. The merging decision was reverted in 2001.

With the enactment of the Law on Investment in 2007, ICB became a Government agency that is the coordinator of investment policy, both among government agencies, the government and Bank Indonesia, as well as the government with regional governments as well as regional governments with regional governments. ICB is also mandated as an advocacy body for investors.

Alcoholic Beverages Investment Controversy
In 2021, president signed the presidential regulation on investment. However, the presidential regulation became controversy as the regulation regulated the investment on alcoholic beverages. The alcoholic beverages investment regulation annex was repealed.

Ministry of Investment
On 30 March 2021, Joko Widodo submitted a Presidential Letter No. R-14/Pres/03/2021 to People's Representative Council contained a proposal for major change his cabinet. In his Presidential Letter, Ministry of Investment, will be spin off from existing Coordinating Ministry for Maritime and Investments Affairs to be independent ministry on its own, but still under its coordination.

On 9 April 2021, People's Representative Council, approved the changes. 

The form of the ministry is not yet known at that time of announcement of approval. It was speculated that the new ministry either split off from part of Coordinating Ministry for Maritime and Investments Affairs or elevation of existing Indonesia Investment Coordinating Board. However, it later confirmed that the ministry actually elevation of Indonesia Investment Coordinating Board. If done, this ministry is continuation of previously Suharto era and early Reformasi era's Habibie State Ministry of the Promotion of Investment, which existed during 1993 to 1999, during Sixth Development Cabinet and Development Reform Cabinet, respectively.

On 13 April 2021, Ali Mochtar Ngabalin, spokesperson and expert professional of Deputy IV (Information and Political Communication) Presidential Staff Office, announced that the second reshuffle will take place on second week of April 2021. However, due to many reasons, the second reshuffle finally announced at 28 April 2021. Unusual for reshuffle happened in Indonesia, this reshuffle was the first of its kind which not only reshuffled the ministers, but also disbanding ministry institutions during the mid-term. In this reshuffle, Bahlil Lahadalia appointed as the first holder of Minister of Investment. All appointed officials inaugurated and their respective new offices were established with Presidential Decision No. 72/P/2021.

Head of ICB
 Sanyoto Sastrowardoyo (1993–1998)
 Hamzah Haz (1998–1999)
 Marzuki Usman (1999)
 Muhammad Zuhal (Caretaker) (1999)
 Laksamana Sukardi (1999–2000)
 M. Rozy Munir (2000)
 Theo Toemion (2001–2005)
 Muhammad Lutfi (2005–2009)
 Gita Wirjawan (2009–2012)
 Muhammad Chatib Basri (2012–2013)
 Mahendra Siregar (2013–2014)
 Franky Sibarani (2014–2016)
 Thomas Trikasih Lembong (2016–2019)
 Bahlil Lahadalia (2019–)

Main Responsibilities and Functions
BKPM has the task of coordinating policies and services in the investment sector based on the provisions of laws and regulations. In carrying out these main tasks, BKPM carries out the following functions:
 Reviewing and proposing a national investment plan
 Coordination of the implementation of national policies in the investment sector
 Reviewing and proposing investment service policies
 Determination of norms, standards and procedures for the implementation of investment service activities
 Development of investment opportunities and potential in the region by empowering business entities
 Making a map of investment in Indonesia
 Coordination of promotion implementation and investment cooperation
 Development of the investment business sector through investment development. among others, increasing partnerships, increasing competitiveness, creating fair business competition, and disseminating information as widely as possible within the scope of investment management.
 Fostering the implementation of investment, and providing assistance in solving various obstacles and consulting on problems faced by investors in carrying out investment activities
 Coordination and implementation of one-stop integrated services
 Coordination of domestic investors who carry out their investment activities outside the territory of Indonesia
 Providing licensing services and investment facilities
 Guidance and general administration services in the fields of general planning, administration, organization and management, personnel, education and training, finance, law, public relations, archives, data and information processing, equipment and household; and
 Implementation of other functions in the field of investment in accordance with the provisions of the legislation.

Organization
On 29 July 2021, the structure of the ministry and the board amended with the issuance of Presidential Decree No. 63/2021 (Ministry of Investment) and No. 64/2021 (Indonesia Investment Coordinating Board). With the amendment, the structure and responsibilities between the ministry and the board are clearly separated, not mixed as before.

The board, as the Presidential Decree No. 64/2021 outlined, had the role as the executioner and controlling the implementation of the investment policies in Indonesia. The board organized in following manner:

 Office of the Chief of Indonesia Investment Coordinating Board.
 Office of the Vice Chief of Indonesia Investment Coordinating Board.
 Main Secretariat
 Bureau of Funds and Programs Planning
 Bureau of Law Affairs
 Bureau of Communication and Information Service
 Bureau of Protocols and Administration
 Division of Protocol Affairs
 Division of Leadership Administration
 Division of Deputy I Administration
 Division of Deputy II Administration
 Division of Deputy III Administration
 Division of Deputy IV Administration
 Division of Deputy V Administration
 Division of Deputy VI Administration
 Division of Deputy VII Administration
 Division of Deputy VIII Administration
 Division of Deputy IX Administration
 Bureau of General Affairs
 Division of Equipment
 Division of Household Affairs
 Division of Security
 Deputy of Investment Planning (Deputy I)
 Directorate of Natural Resources Investment Planning
 Directorate of Manufacture Industries Investment Planning
 Directorate of Services and Regional Investment Planning
 Directorate of Infrastructure Investment Planning
 Deputy of Strategic Investment Down-streaming (Deputy II)
 Directorate of Investment in Agricultural, Plantation, Marine, Fishery, and Forestry Down-streaming
 Directorate of Investment in Oil and Gas Down-streaming
 Directorate of Investment in Mineral and Coal Down-streaming
 Deputy of Investment Climate Development (Deputy III)
 Directorate of Investment Deregulation
 Directorate of Regional Potential Development
 Directorate of Enterprises Empowerment 
 Deputy of Investment Promotion (Deputy IV)
 Directorate of Investment Promotion Development
 Directorate of Investment Promotion in America and Europe
 Directorate of Investment Promotion in East Asia, South Asia, Middle East, and Africa
 Directorate of Investment Promotion in Southeast Asia, Australia, New Zealand, and Pacific
 Deputy of Investment Cooperation (Deputy V)
 Directorate of Bilateral Investment Cooperation
 Directorate of Regional and Multilateral Investment Cooperation
 Directorate of Businesses Cooperation
 Deputy of Investment Services (Deputy VI)
 Directorate of Investment Services in Industrial Sectors
 Sub-directorate of Investment Services in Agronomical, Chemicals, Pharmacies, and Textile Sectors
 Sub-directorate of Investment Services in Metals, Machinery, Transportation, and Electronics Sectors
 Directorate of Investment Services in Non-Industrial Sectors
 Sub-directorate of Investment Services in Natural Resources, Infrastructures, and Transportation Sectors
 Sub-directorate of Investment Services in Trade, Tourism, and Others
 Directorate of Investment Services in Entrepreneurship Facilitation
 Sub-directorate of Investment Services in Primary and Tertiary Sectors
 Sub-directorate of Investment Services in Secondary Sectors
Deputy of Control of Investment Implementation (Deputy VII)
Controlling Directorate Region I (Aceh, North Sumatera, Riau, Riau Islands, South Sumatera, Lampung)
Controlling Directorate Region II (Jambi, Jakarta, Yogyakarta, East Kalimantan, South Kalimantan, West Kalimantan, and Central Kalimantan)
Controlling Directorate Region III (West Java, Banten, Central Java, South Sulawesi, Central Sulawesi, Southeast Sulawesi, and North Sulawesi)
Controlling Directorate Region IV (East Jawa, Bali, West Nusa Tenggara, East Nusa Tenggara, Maluku, North Maluku and Papua)
Controlling Directorate Region V (Bengkulu, Bangka Belitung, North Kalimantan, West Sulawesi, Gorontalo, and West Papua)
Deputy of Investment Information and Technology (Deputy VIII)
Directorate of Business Licensing System
Directorate of Electronic Services, Infrastructures, and Networking
Directorate of Data and Information
Centers
 Education and Training Center
 Office of the General Inspectorate

References

External links
 Official website

Government agencies of Indonesia